Ali Tufan Kıraç (born 17 June 1972) is a Turkish anatolian rock and heavy metal musician.

As a son of a teacher, he began his elementary studies in his birthplace of Göksun. He completed his primary and secondary education in Hasköy, Istanbul. After he completed his high school education, he joined the Marmara University, Atatürk Faculty of Music Education.

Discography

Albums
 1998: Deli Düş
 2000: Bir Garip Aşk Bestesi
 2001: Sevgiliye
 2001: Zaman
 2003: Kayıp Şehir
 2007: Benim Yolum
 2008: Kıraç Toprağın Türküleri
 2009: Garbiyeli
 2009: Rock Dünyasından Sesleniş
 2009: Yolcu
 2011: Derindekiler
 2014: Çık Hayatımdan

Singles
 2008: Haydi Haydi
 2010: Show Zamanı
 2011: Dön Artık
 2013: Beddua
 2016: Yolun Sonu
 2016: Senden Sonra
 2017: Kerkük Zindanı
 2018: Benim Halkım
 2020: Hayat 
 2021: Vatan Marşı
 2021: Gel Sevdiğim
 2021: Melekler Ağlar
 2021: Aşk Yasak mı?
 2021: Çemberimde Gül Oya (with Bertuğ Cemil and Su Soley)
 2021: Haydi

Compilations
 2019: Beni Ben Yapan Şarkılar

Personal life 
Kıraç married actor Ayşe Şule Bilgiç in 2008. The couple had two children, named Elif Iraz and Çağrı Manas.

Soundtracks of TV series 
Kıraç has prepared the soundtracks of a number of TV series, including Zerda, Aliye, Unutulmaz, Binbir Gece and Beyaz Gelincik, Bir İstanbul Masalı and Kaçak.

References

External links 
 Official website

1972 births
Turkish film score composers
Turkish rock singers
Turkish singer-songwriters
Living people
21st-century Turkish singers
Male film score composers
Turkish heavy metal singers
21st-century Turkish male singers
Turkish socialists